William or Willy Russell (or other variants) may refer to:
Ordered chronologically within each section or subsection.

Actors and directors
 William Russell (American actor) (1884–1929), stage and screen performer
 William D. Russell (director) (1908–1968), American film and TV director
 William Russell (English actor) (born 1924), film and TV performer

Business
 William Russell (banker) (1734–1817) English merchant who made a fortune from coal 
 William Russell (merchant) (1740–1818), English businessman
 William Hepburn Russell (1812–1872), American businessman, founder of Pony Express
 William Greeneberry Russell (1818–1887), American prospector and miner

Education
 William Russell (educator) (1798–1873), American teacher born in Scotland
 William Fletcher Russell (1890–1956), American educationalist; president of Teachers College
 William D. Russell (historian) (born 1938), American history professor

Politics

Kingdom of England
 William Russell (knight) (1257–1311), holder of a moiety of the feudal barony of North Cadbury, Somerset
 William Russell, 1st Baron Russell of Thornhaugh (1553/63–1613), English military commander
 Sir William Russell, 1st Baronet, of Chippenham (before 1585–1654), English MP for Windsor
 Sir William Russell, 1st Baronet, of Wytley (1602–1669), English MP for Worcestershire
 William Russell, 1st Duke of Bedford (1616–1700), English peer and soldier
 William Russell, Lord Russell (1639–1683), English politician

United Kingdom
 Lord William Russell (1767–1840), MP best known as a murder victim
 Sir William Russell, 1st Baronet, of Charlton Park (1773–1839), British baronet
 William Congreve Russell (1778–1850), English MP and High Sheriff of Worcestershire
 William Russell (Durham MP) (1798–1850), Member of Parliament (MP) for Saltash, Bletchingley and County Durham
 William Russell, 8th Duke of Bedford (1809–1872), member of United Kingdom Parliament
 Sir William Russell, 2nd Baronet (1822–1892), MP for Dover, 1857–1859
 William Russell (Bolton MP) (1859–1937), Member of Parliament for Bolton, 1922–1923
 William Russell (Lord Mayor) (born 1965), Lord Mayor of London, 2019–2021

United States
 William Russell (Virginia politician) (1735–1793), Virginia frontier soldier and legislator, father of William Russell of Kentucky
 William Russell (Kentucky politician) (1758–1825), American soldier, pioneer, and politician
 William Russell (Ohio politician) (1782–1845), U.S. Representative from Ohio
 William F. Russell (Florida politician) (c.1805–after 1875), Speaker of Florida House of Representatives
 William Huntington Russell (1809–1885), businessman, educator and politician from Connecticut
 William Fiero Russell (1812–1896), American congressman from New York
 William A. Russell (New York politician) (after 1820–before 1897), New York politician
 William A. Russell (Massachusetts politician) (1831–1899), U.S. Representative from Massachusetts
 William E. Russell (politician) (1857–1896), governor of Massachusetts between 1891 and 1894
 William Hepburn Russell (baseball) (1857–1911), lawyer, politician and owner of Boston Braves
 William W. Russell (before 1870–after 1908), United States Ambassador to Colombia, 1904–1905 and to Venezuela, 1905–1908
 William T. Russell, 2008 congressional candidate in Pennsylvania

Elsewhere
 William Russell (New South Wales politician) (1807–1866), member of the New South Wales Legislative Assembly
 William Russell (New Zealand politician) (1838–1913), Member of Parliament
 William Russell (Australian politician) (1842–1912), Australian senator from South Australia

Religion
 William Russell (bishop of Sodor) (before 1300–1374), Cistercian prelate from Isle of Man
 William Russell (bishop of North China) (1821–1879), Irish Protestant missionary to China
 William Russell (1845–1913), Succentor of St Paul's Cathedral, 1885–1993
 William Thomas Russell (1863–1927), American Roman Catholic bishop of Charleston

Science
 William James Russell (1830–1909), English chemist
 William Russell (physician) (1852–1940), Scottish pathologist
 William Ritchie Russell (1903–1980), British neurologist

Sports
 William Russell (cricketer) (1866–1929), Australian-born English first-class cricketer
 William Russell (fencer) (1896–1958), American Olympic fencer
 Willie Russell (1901–after 1935), Scottish footballer - Airdrieonians, Preston
 Willie Russell (footballer, born 1903) (1903–after 1940), Scottish footballer - Chelsea
 William Eric Russell or Eric Russell (born 1936), Scottish-born English cricketer

Writers and composers
 William Russell (writer) (1741–1793), Scottish historical and miscellaneous writer
 William Russell (organist) (1777–1813), English composer
 William Russell (fiction writer) (1806–1876), English writer of detective and other stories
 William Clark Russell (1844–1911), English writer of nautical novels
 Willy Russell (born 1947), English playwright, lyricist and composer

Other
 William Oldnall Russell (1785–1833), English chief justice of Bengal 
 Lady William Russell (1793–1874), English socialite, wife of Lord George William Russell
 William Howard Russell (1820–1907), Irish reporter; one of first modern war correspondents
 William Carmichael Russell (1824–1905), British Bengal Artillery officer
 William Hamilton Russell (1856–1907), American architect
 William Alison Russell (1875–1948), Scottish lawyer and judge

See also
 Bill Russell (disambiguation)
 Russell Williams (disambiguation)
 Sir William Russell, 1st Baronet (disambiguation)
 William Russel (disambiguation)